Shri Hanuman Chalisa is a 2013 Indian computer animated short film rendition of Hanuman Chalisa produced by Charuvi Design Labs and directed by Charuvi Agrawal. It is based on Hanuman Chalisa originally composed by poet Tulsidas. It won the Best Animation Film award the Jaipur Film Fest.

The film is a visual depiction of the lyrics of "Hanuman Chalisa", a devotional Hindu song which praises the selflessness, strength and devotion of the Hindu god Hanuman during the epic Ramayana in which he was instrumental in freeing Goddess Sita from the clutches of the demon king Ravana.

The film premiered at the 2013 Palm Springs International Film Festival under the title Forty Hymns of Faith.

Plot

The 12-minute short film Shri Hanuman Chalisa  illustrates the 40 verses composed by Tulsidas in 3D format. It consists of scenes about the God Hanuman of Hindu mythology.  It contains narration and stylised images in 3D digital format, interpreting the Chalisa in a new medium, while retaining the original story. The film includes a musical soundtrack.

Singers

Shri Hanuman Chalisa is sung by Shaan , KK, Hariharan, Kunal Ganjawala, Shankar Mahadevan, Sonu Nigam, Babul Supriyo, Kumar shanu, Udit Narayan, Abhijit bhattacharya, Rahat fateh ali khan, Sukhwinder Singh,Roop kumar Rathore, Kailash Kher, Suresh wadkar and  Many more

Screenings
Shri Hanuman Chalisa was screened at various festivals around the world, including the SIGGRAPH Computer Animation Festival in 2011. and the Palm Springs International ShortFest, the Edinburgh International Film Festival, the Anima Mundi, the Toronto Animation Arts Festival International, the Dimension-3 Film Festival, and Rhode Island International Film Festival in 2013. It was also show at the Jaipur International Film Festival in 2014.

Awards

ANIMA+ AWARD 2015, Brazil.
Jaipur International Film Festival, 2014 – Best Animation award
FICCI BAF, 2014
ORBIT LIVE – Industry Honors' 2014-Outstanding India Design Based IP
CMS International Children's Film Festival, 2014-Best Audience Award

References

External links 

  lyricsveer.in